The Civil Initiatives Committee (CIC of KGI; ; Komitet grazhdanskikh initsiativ, KGI) is a liberal community of politicians, experts and public figures, positioning itself as a non-partisan association of professionals in key spheres of life (in economy, science, education, healthcare, culture) "around the idea of modernizing the country and strengthening democratic institutions". Created on April 5, 2012 by Alexei Kudrin and a number of other politicians and public figures "in order to determine and implement the best option for the country's development".

The name was co-authored with Andrey Nechaev. The creation of a Liberal Democratic Party under this name was postponed because "He (Kudrin) talked to Vladimir Vladimirovich (Putin) and decided that it was too early (to create) the party, we should limit ourselves to creating a committee.".Later, under the chairmanship of Nechaev, the "Civic Initiative" appeared, of which Kudrin did not become a member.

The preconditions for the creation of the Committee were the December events - the 2011 elections and the subsequent rallies on Bolotnaya Square on December 10 and on Academician Sakharov Avenue in Moscow on December 24, 2011. «The past elections demonstrated the desire of citizens to really influence the state of affairs in our country, choose the course of its development» — said in a statement on the creation of the Committee for Civil Initiatives, published on the official website of Alexei Kudrin.

Foundation for Support of Civil Initiatives "Dialogue" 
Since September 2017, the Kudrin Foundation for the Development of Civil Initiatives has been supporting the Committee's activities. Since September 04, 2018, the Foundation has been renamed the Dialogue Foundation for the Development of Civil Initiatives. The Foundation is the organizer and administrator of the research, information, analytical and advisory work of the Committee. The main assets of the Fund are property contributions and donations from Russian individuals and legal entities.

Targets and goals 
The statement on the creation of the Committee outlines the main intentions of the organization:

 creation of infrastructure to support civil initiatives;
 open opposition to the actions of the authorities, regardless of persons and positions;
 proposals for public discussion and civil examination of alternative options for solving political, economic and social problems.

Among the priority projects of the Committee are:

 "Fair trial" - real independence of the judiciary, including the election of court presidents.
 “School of Local Government” - search, analysis and dissemination of best practices.
 "Open budget" - publicity of the formation and execution of the budget at all levels, including the municipal one.
 "Transparent Police" - publication of detailed criminal statistics, public audit, election of heads of departments.
 "Civic Mutual Aid" - strengthening horizontal ties in society.
 “Health care for all” is a transition from a “wild” market of paid medical services to a system of providing quality care for all categories of citizens.
 "Equal Start" - the general availability of quality education, which should ensure a successful entry into the labor market.

Activities of the Civil Initiatives Committee 
During the work of the Committee, its experts carried out a large number of studies, on the basis of which dozens of reports and legislative initiatives were prepared, including: on the pension system, on education and health care, on elections and the electoral system, on local self-government, on the law enforcement and judicial system, about migration and demographic processes, about public control, about open data, about the mass media, about the specifics of the North Caucasian regions, about the positioning of Russia in the global economy, about the dynamics of social attitudes and moods of Russians.

On the initiative of the members of the Committee, the Free Historical Society was created, designed to protect historical knowledge from the pressure of the political conjuncture.

With the participation of the Committee, the "Mediastandard" foundation was created, which carries out research on media institutions in Russian regions.

Every year, the Civil Initiatives Committee holds a competition for the «Civil Initiative Prize», 11 laureates of which receive the Golden Sprout statuette and a cash prize.

The committee takes an active part in the dissemination of proactive budgeting practices. In 2016, in several dozen regions of the country, projects worth about 4.5 billion rubles are being implemented on their basis.

To carry out the educational mission, the Committee created the "KGI University", in the face-to-face and online programs of which several thousand listeners have already taken part.

Together with the most famous and authoritative public organizations, KIG has been holding the All-Russian Civil Forum for four years in a row - the largest annual meeting of representatives of Russian civil society in order to discuss the most pressing problems and jointly develop proposals for their solution.

With the support of the Committee, dozens of books have been published, and several educational Internet sites have been developed and maintained. The Committee regularly meets to discuss the current agenda, often makes statements in which it assesses the most important events and trends in the life of the country.

List of Committee members 

 
 Ivan Begtin
 Nikita Belykh
 Sergei Borisov
 Andrey Galiyev
 Leonid Gozman
 Evgeny Gontmakher
 Yakov Gordin
 Yuli Gusman
 Mikhail Dmitriev
 Anatoly Ermolin
 Kirill Kabanov
 Irina Karelina
 Valeria Kasamara
 Andrey Kolesnikov
 Yuri Komarov
 Alexei Kudrin
 Vasily Melnichenko
 Vladimir Nazarov
 Andrey Nechaev
 Dmitry Oreshkin
 Viktor Pleskachevsky
 Vladimir Pozner
 Igor Pototsky
 Joseph Raihelgauz
 Alexander Rubtsov
 Nikolai Svanidze
 Dmitry Travin
 Mark Urnov
 Vitaly Ushkanov
 Sergey Tsyplyaev
 Igor Yurgens
 Yana Yakovleva
 Yevgeny Yasin
 Irina Yasina

Analytical reports 
The first analytical review of the Committee is dedicated to the regional elections on October 14, 2012.

All-Russian Civil Forum 

On November 3, 2013, the Committee for Civil Initiatives and the Kudrin Foundation held the first All-Russian Civil Forum in Moscow. As stated on the Forum's website, "the idea of a forum of representatives of civil society was a response to the contradictory policy of the state authorities in relation to the non-profit sector."

Ten well-known Russian public figures came forward with the initiative to convene the forum in July 2013: Lyudmila Alekseeva, Evgeny Gontmakher, Anatoly Ermolin, Alexey Kudrin, Elena Panfilova, Irina Prokhorova, Alexey Simonov, Elena Topoleva-Soldunova, Igor Chestin and Irina Yasina.

The forum is positioned by the organizers as an event that gives civil society the opportunity to take part in the development of proposals for the development of the country..

November 22, 2014 in Moscow in Cosmos Hotel was the second All-Russian Civil Forum under the theme "dialogue. Solidarity. Responsibility".

At the third forum held on November 21-22, 2015, Aleksey Kudrin admitted that the participation of representatives of the authorities in the event had to be coordinated with the ministries and the Presidential Administration.

On November 25, 2017, the fifth All-Russian civil forum on the topic "The future of Russia: federation, regions, cities" was held in Moscow at the Cosmos Hotel. The heads of federal and regional departments, ministers and deputy ministers, governors, vice-governors and mayors of cities took part in the forum. Among them are Moscow Mayor Sergey Sobyanin, Open government Minister Mikhail Abyzov, Health Minister Veronika Skvortsova, CEC head Ella Pamfilova and Russian Deputy Justice Minister Denis Novak.

Criticism 
Experts and politicians assess the initiative to create the Committee differently, from a sincere desire for change for the better to a pro-Kremlin project that distracts the liberal community from radical protests.

See also 

 Gaidar Forum

External links 

 Site of the Civil Initiatives Committee
 Site of the All-Russian Civil Forum

References 

Political opposition
Liberalism in Russia